This is a list of the first minority male lawyer(s) and judge(s) in Utah. It includes the year in which the men were admitted to practice law (in parentheses). Also included are men who achieved other distinctions such becoming the first in their state to graduate from law school or become a political figure.

Firsts in Utah's history

Lawyers 

 First African American male: Lawrence Marsh (1909) 
 First Japanese American male: Yoshio Katayama (1946) 
First Native American males admitted to the Utah State Bar: Thomas G. Nelford and Larry Echo Hawk (1973) 
 First Hispanic American males admitted to the Utah State Bar: Melvin H. Martinez (1975), Armando R. Ibañez (1975), and Michael N. Martinez (1976): 
 First Tongan American male: Phil Uipi (1986)

State judges 

 First Asian American male (Japanese descent): Raymond Uno (1959)  
 First African American male: Tyrone Medley (1977) in 1984 
 First Native American (Pomo) male: William A. Thorne Jr. (1977) in 1986
 First Hispanic American male: Andrew Valdez (1977) in 1993 
 First Native American (Pomo) male (Utah Court of Appeals): William A. Thorne Jr. (1977) in 2000

Federal judges 
First Hispanic American male (U.S. District Court for the District of Utah): Samuel Alba (1980)

Attorney General of Utah 

First Asian American male (Filipino descent): Sean Reyes (1997) in 2013

Assistant Attorney General 

 First African American male: Henry Lee Adams

Firsts in local history 
 Joseph Greco: First male lawyer of Italian descent in Carbon County, Utah

 Henry Lee Adams:  First African American male to graduate from the University of Utah's S.J. Quinney College of Law (1959) [Salt Lake County, Utah]
 Robert Archuleta: First Latino American male to graduate from the University of Utah's S.J. Quinney College of Law (1974) [Salt Lake County, Utah]

 Keith N. Hamilton: First African American male to graduate from the J. Reuben Clark Law School of Brigham Young University [Utah County, Utah]

See also 

 List of first minority male lawyers and judges in the United States

Other topics of interest 

 List of first women lawyers and judges in the United States
 List of first women lawyers and judges in Utah

References 

 
Minority, Utah, first
Minority, Utah, first
Legal history of Utah
Lists of people from Utah
Utah lawyers